Lucas Fernandes da Silva (born 20 September 1997), known as Lucas Fernandes, is a Brazilian professional footballer who plays for Botafogo, on loan from Portimonense as a central midfielder.

Club career
Born in São Bernardo do Campo, São Paulo, Lucas Fernandes joined São Paulo's youth setup in 2011, aged 13. On 15 February 2016, he scored the winner in a 1–0 win against Liverpool Montevideo, as his side was crowned champions of 2016 U-20 Copa Libertadores. Ten days later, he was promoted to the first team by manager Edgardo Bauza.

On 20 March 2016 Lucas Fernandes made his first team debut, coming on as a late substitute for goalscorer Paulo Henrique Ganso in a 1–1 Campeonato Paulista away draw against Ituano. He made his Série A debut on 15 May, scoring the game's only in a 1–0 home win against Botafogo.

On 14 June 2016, Lucas Fernandes suffered a severe knee injury, being sidelined for six months.

Honours
São Paulo
U-20 Copa do Brasil: 2015
U-20 Copa Libertadores: 2016

References

External links

1997 births
Living people
People from São Bernardo do Campo
Brazilian footballers
Association football midfielders
Campeonato Brasileiro Série A players
Primeira Liga players
São Paulo FC players
Botafogo de Futebol e Regatas players
Portimonense S.C. players
Brazilian expatriate footballers
Expatriate footballers in Portugal
Footballers from São Paulo (state)